Edmond Faral (18 March 1882 – 8 February 1958) was an Algerian-born French medievalist. He became in 1924 Professor of Latin literature at the Collège de France.

He wrote his dissertation on the jongleurs, and E. R. Curtius states that he was the first to recognize an influence of the medieval Latin poetics and rhetoric on Old French poetry.  He was appointed to the Académie des Inscriptions et Belles-Lettres in 1936.

Works
Les Jongleurs en France au Moyen-Âge (1910)
Mimes français du XIIIe siècle (1910)
Courtois d'Arras : jeu du XIIIe siècle (1911)
Recherches sur les Sources Latines des Contes et Romans Courtois du Moyen-Âge (1913)
Gautier D'aupais. Poème Courtois du XIIIème siècle (1919)
Le Roman de Troie en prose (1922) editor with L. Constans
La légende arthurienne. Études et documents. Les plus anciens textes (1929)
La Chanson de Roland (1932) 
Les Arts poétiques du XIIe et du XIIIe siècle
Vie quotidienne au temps de Saint Louis (1938)
Textes relatifs à la civilisation matérielle et morale des temps modernes (1938)
Petite grammaire de l'ancien français, XIIe-XIIIe siècles (1941)
Onze poèmes de Rutebeuf concernant la croisade (1946) editor with J. Bastin 
De Babione (Poème comique du XIIème siècle) (1948)
Jean Buridan. Notes sur les manuscrits, les éditions et le contenu de ses ouvrages, Archives d'Histoire Doctrinale et Littéraire du Moyen-Âge 15: 1-53 (1946) 
Jean Buridan: Maître és arts de l'Université de Paris, Histoire Littéraire de la France 28 (1949)
Guillaume de Digulleville, moine de Châalis (1952)
Les arts poétiques du XIIème et du XIII siècles. Recherches et documents sur la technique littéraire du Moyen Age (1958)
Oeuvres complètes de Rutebeuf (1959–60)

Notes

External links
 Biography
 Collège de France - Professeurs disparus

1882 births
1958 deaths
Book editors
Academic staff of the Collège de France
French literary historians
Literary scholars
Algerian medievalists
French medievalists
Members of the Académie des Inscriptions et Belles-Lettres
Scholars of Latin literature
Corresponding Fellows of the Medieval Academy of America
Migrants from French Algeria to France